Harold Parker Gilmour (19 March 1903 – 16 April 1969) was a volunteer Antarctic explorer, at $1 per annum, for the 1939–1941 Byrd Polar Expedition to Antarctica, as part of the United States Antarctic Service (USAS). Mount Gilmour, located in Antarctica, is named in his honor.

Role as an explorer in the Byrd Antarctic Expedition 1939–1941

  
Harold P. Gilmour,  "Gil", was the Administrative Assistant to the Expedition Commander, Rear Admiral Richard E. Byrd and was the official Recorder and Historian for the Expedition. The vessel had originally set sail from Boston on 15 November 1939 after months of preparation for the voyage to Antarctica. The stop in Philadelphia was to load two planes on board. One was a single-engine Beechcraft to be used together with the Snow Cruiser, and the other was a twin-engine Condor to be used at the West Base for geological exploratory flights. Gilmour's recordings have been deposited in the National Archives in Washington, D.C.. Gilmour also made a parallel, unofficial journal of all daily events that is much more comprehensive and covers more personal aspects of the Expedition members ordeals during their time as part of this Expedition. This unofficial journal is in the hands of Gilmour's children.

Born in Lynn, Massachusetts, Gilmour enlisted in the Navy as a teenager and was subsequently Honorably Discharged. When Gilmour was in his mid-thirties, he decided to switch gears and seek adventure and he volunteered for the United States Antarctic Service (USAS) to participate as an explorer in the 1939–1941 Expedition to the South Pole. He was assigned to Little America III – the West Base. During the long 1940 winter night, a Geological Party Expedition of four men was organized at the West Base and they prepared for the extremely long sledging trek on board two dog sleds to the Edsel Ford Ranges. The four-man party was composed of Lawrence A. Warner, leader and geologist, Charles F. Passel, geologist and radio operator, Harold P. Gilmour "Gil", recorder and collector of biological specimens and Loran Wells "Joe", photographer and observer. The extensive Warpasgiljo Glacier was discovered and named for these four members (WARner + PASsel + GILmour + JOe) of the Geological Party Expedition.

The Geological Party's Expedition mapped and geologically surveyed most of the southern portion of the Edsel Ford Range, and also investigated the different natural resources of the area. They also triangulated and measured accurately to help create improved maps of the region. The four-man Geological Party Expedition left the West Base on 17 October 1940 and returned 82 days later on 7 January 1941 traveling a total of 691 nautical miles on board their dog sleds. Shortly into this almost 3-month expedition, one of Gilmour's wood skis broke. With no way to repair the ski, Gilmour continued with a half ski, and was nicknamed by the other Expedition Party members as "Ski-and-a-Half Gilmour". This extra strain on one leg left Gilmour with a limp for the rest of his life. He also had two toes amputated due to frostbite, a common occurrence among explorers of that era. In the nearly three-month expedition, they had to be supported by airplanes that deposited supplies at 100-mile intervals along their charted route. The Geological Party Expedition visited for the first time some 50 peaks in this region and some 300 geological specimens were collected. Mount Gilmour was one of those peaks and was named in honor of Harold P. Gilmour.

Awards

Gilmour was awarded an Antarctic Expedition Medal (gold version) for voluntary services duly rendered as Administrative Assistant and official Recorder and Historian to Rear Admiral Richard E. Byrd during the 1939–1941 Polar Exploration to Antarctica. This medal was authorized by Congress on 24 September 1945 (Public Law 185, 79th Congress, 59 Stat. 536), to members of the United States Antarctic Expedition of 1939–1941. The medal was presented to Gilmour in Santiago, Chile by the US Ambassador Claude G. Bowers.

Family

Harold P. Gilmour was married to the former Agnes Vinson whom he later divorced and they had three children:
Gloria Gilmour
Ruth Marie Gilmour
Phillip "Buddy" Gilmour

On the homeward bound trip from Antarctica to Boston, the  stopped for a few days in Valparaíso. There, Gilmour met a lady belonging to the Chilean aristocracy, María Teresa Correa Santa Cruz great-granddaughter of the Counts of La Conquista, from Viña del Mar, Chile at a US Consulate reception. Nine months later, she traveled in company of her chaperon, her uncle Domingo Santa María Santa Cruz, to Oxford, Ohio where they were married on 24 April 1942. Together, they had three children:

Cynthia L. Gilmour, born 24 June 1947 d 19 September 2002 (grandchildren Christopher Harrison Gilmour; Francisca Frias Gilmour) Rear Admiral Richard E. Byrd was Cynthia's Godfather.
Gregory D. Gilmour, born 1 January 1954 (grandchildren Gregory D. Gilmour Jr., Ashley Victoria Gilmour)
Noel M. Gilmour, born 1956 (grandchildren Nicolas Ferre Gilmour, Alexander Ferre Gilmour, Zachary Ferre Gilmour)

Death

Gilmour died in Viña del Mar, Chile at the age of 66, and is buried at the historical Cemetery Number 1 in Valparaíso, Chile, that overlooks the Bay of Valparaíso.

References

1903 births
1969 deaths
Explorers of Antarctica
American polar explorers
People from Lynn, Massachusetts
Congressional Gold Medal recipients